This is a round-up of the 1991 Sligo Intermediate Football Championship. Enniscrone won their first Intermediate title at the third attempt, after a narrow win over first-time finalists Drumcliffe/Rosses Point.

First round

Quarter finals

Semi-finals

Final

Sligo Intermediate Football Championship
Sligo Intermediate Football Championship